An S-layer (surface layer) is a part of the cell envelope found in almost all archaea, as well as in many types of bacteria.
The S-layers of both archaea and bacteria consists of a monomolecular layer composed of only one (or, in a few cases, two) identical proteins or glycoproteins. This structure is built via self-assembly and encloses the whole cell surface. Thus, the S-layer protein can represent up to 15% of the whole protein content of a cell. S-layer proteins are poorly conserved or not conserved at all, and can differ markedly even between related species.  Depending on species, the S-layers have a thickness between 5 and 25 nm and possess identical pores with 2–8 nm in diameter.

The terminology “S-layer” was used the first time in 1976. The general use was accepted at the "First International Workshop on Crystalline Bacterial Cell Surface Layers, Vienna (Austria)" in 1984, and in the year 1987 S-layers were defined at the European Molecular Biology Organization Workshop on “Crystalline Bacterial Cell Surface Layers”, Vienna as “Two-dimensional arrays of proteinaceous subunits forming surface layers on prokaryotic cells” (see "Preface", page VI in Sleytr "et al. 1988"). For a brief summary on the history of S-layer research see references

Location of S-layers 

 In Gram-negative bacteria, S-layers are associated to the lipopolysaccharides via ionic, carbohydrate–carbohydrate, protein–carbohydrate interactions and/or protein–protein interactions.
 In Gram-positive bacteria whose S-layers often contain surface layer homology (SLH) domains, the binding occurs to the peptidoglycan and to a secondary cell wall polymer (e.g., teichoic acids). In the absence of SLH domains, the binding occurs via electrostatic interactions between the positively charged N-terminus of the S-layer protein and a negatively charged secondary cell wall polymer. In Lactobacilli the binding domain may be located at the C-terminus.
 In Gram-negative archaea, S-layer proteins possess a hydrophobic anchor that is associated with the underlying lipid membrane.
 In Gram-positive archaea, the S-layer proteins bind to pseudomurein or to methanochondroitin.

Biological functions of the S-layer 
For many bacteria, the S-layer represents the outermost interaction zone with their respective environment. Its functions are very diverse and vary from species to species.
In many archaeal species the S-layer is the only cell wall component and, therefore, is important for mechanical and osmotic stabilization. Additional functions associated with S-layers include:
 protection against bacteriophages, Bdellovibrios, and phagocytosis
 resistance against low pH
 barrier against high-molecular-weight substances (e.g., lytic enzymes)
 adhesion (for glycosylated S-layers)
 stabilisation of the membrane (e.g. the SDBC in Deinococcus radiodurans) 
 resistance against electromagnetic stress (e.g. ionizing radiations and high temperatures) 
 provision of adhesion sites for exoproteins
 provision of a periplasmic compartment in Gram-positive prokaryotes together with the peptidoglycan and the cytoplasmic membranes
 anti-fouling properties
 biomineralization
 molecular sieve and barrier function

S-layer structure 
While ubiquitous among Archaea, and common in bacteria, the S-layers of diverse organisms have unique structural properties, including symmetry and unit cell dimensions, due to fundamental differences in their constituent building blocks. Sequence analyses of S-layer proteins have predicted that S-layer proteins have sizes of 40-200 kDa and may be composed of multiple domains some of which may be structurally related. Since the first evidence of a macromolecular array on a bacterial cell wall fragment in the 1950s S-layer structure has been investigated extensively by electron microscopy and medium resolution images of S-layers from these analyses has provided useful information on overall S-layer morphology. High-resolution structures of an archaeal S-layer protein (MA0829 from Methanosarcina acetivorans C2A) of the Methanosarcinales S-layer Tile Protein family and a bacterial S-layer protein (SbsB), from Geobacillus stearothermophilus PV72, have recently been determined by X-ray crystallography. In contrast with existing crystal structures, which have represented individual domains of S-layer proteins or minor proteinaceous components of the S-layer, the MA0829 and SbsB structures have allowed high resolution models of the M. acetivorans and G. stearothermophilus S-layers to be proposed. These models exhibit hexagonal (p6) and oblique (p2) symmetry, for M. acetivorans and G. stearothermophilus S-layers, respectively, and their molecular features, including dimensions and porosity, are in good agreement with data from electron microscopy studies of archaeal and bacterial S-layers.

In general, S-layers exhibit either an oblique (p1, p2), square (p4) or hexagonal (p3, p6) lattice symmetry. Depending on the lattice symmetry, each morphological unit of the S-layer is composed of one (p1), two (p2), three (p3), four (p4), or six (p6) identical protein subunits. The center-to-center spacing (or unit cell dimensions) between these subunits range from 4 to 35 nm.

Self-assembly

In vivo assembly 
Assembly of a highly ordered coherent monomolecular S-layer array on a growing cell surface requires a continuous synthesis of a surplus of S-layer proteins and their translocation to sites of lattice growth. Moreover, information concerning this dynamic process were obtained from reconstitution experiments with isolated S-layer subunits on cell surfaces from which they had been removed (homologous reattachment) or on those of other organisms (heterologous reattachment).

In vitro assembly 
S-layer proteins have the natural capability to self-assemble into regular monomolecular arrays in solution and at interfaces, such as solid supports, the air-water interface, lipid films, liposomes, emulsomes, nanocapsules, nanoparticles or micro beads. S-layer crystal growth follows a non-classical pathway in which a final refolding step of the S-layer protein is part of the lattice formation.

Application 
Native S-layer proteins have already been used three decades ago in the development of biosensors and ultrafiltration membranes. Subsequently, S-layer fusion proteins with specific functional  domains (e.g. enzymes, ligands, mimotopes, antibodies or antigens) allowed to investigate completely new strategies for functionalizing surfaces in the life sciences, such as in the development of novel affinity matrices, mucosal vaccines, biocompatible surfaces, micro carriers and encapsulation systems, or in the material sciences as templates for biomineralization.

References

Cell anatomy
Membrane biology